No Name Face is the debut studio album by American rock band Lifehouse. It was released on October 31, 2000, by DreamWorks Records and it produced the hit single "Hanging by a Moment" which went on to be the most played song on radio the following year. This album launched Lifehouse into the limelight, and produced many radio-friendly hits. It has sold over four million copies worldwide, with 2,670,000 copies sold in the US alone.

Lead singer and songwriter Jason Wade originally formed Lifehouse as a church rock band, and often performed for church worship services before signing to the commercial record label DreamWorks.

Reception

Critical reception

Liana Jonas of AllMusic gave the album three out of five stars, noting how the "music aptly supports Wade's sonorous voice." She further commented on Wade's songwriting abilities by saying that Wade "is a lyrical wunderkind, writing words generally reserved for his older counterparts." iTunes compared Wade's voice on the album to Eddie Vedder of Pearl Jam, Scott Stapp of Creed, and Scott Weiland formerly of Stone Temple Pilots and Velvet Revolver. They then commented on the musicality of the album by saying, "it's an intelligent musical formula sorely missed in much music of the early 21st century". John DiBiase of Jesus Freak Hideout gave the album three-and-a-half out of five stars, and called the album a "good mainstream album to check out from a band who seems to have a lot to offer which we're bound to see in the near future". Dave Urbanski from Today's Christian Music applauded the instrumentation on the album and also said that the band had "skillful musicianship, poetic insight, [and] unflinching takes on faith".

Promotion
On August 7, 2001, DreamWorks Records announced that Lifehouse was preparing for their first headlining tour in support of No Name Face. It was also announced that the opening acts would be The Calling and Michelle Branch. When asked how the band approaches live performances in an interview with MTV Radio, Wade said, "On the record, there's a couple tracks that are more mellow, with acoustic guitars and stuff. But in our live show, we've been trying to keep it really up-tempo. It's gotten a lot rockier than on the record. We try to step it up with the guitars, getting them crunchier and picking the tempos up to draw the crowd in more. So the live show's a little more energetic than the record."

Tour dates

Track listing

Personnel 
Produced by Ron Aniello
 Jason Wade – vocals, guitars
 Sergio Andrade – bass
 Jon Palmer – drums

Additional personnel 
 Ron Aniello – guitar, bass, keyboards, percussion, engineer
 Collin Hayden – electric guitar
 Aaron Lord – viola
 Marcus Barone – chamberlaine
 Aaron Embry – keyboards
 John Leftwich – string bass
 Bob Glaub – bass
 Jack Kelly – drums
 Matt Laug – drums
 Walter Rodriquez – tambourine
 Jude Cole – background vocals
 Kendall Payne – background vocals
 Neal Averon – engineer
 Jim Scott – engineer
 Brendan O'Brien – mixing
 Maxfield Parrish – cover painting

Charts

Weekly charts

Year-end charts

Certifications

References

Lifehouse (band) albums
2000 debut albums
DreamWorks Records albums
Albums produced by Ron Aniello
Interscope Geffen A&M Records albums